Gymnobela baruna is a species of sea snail, a marine gastropod mollusk in the family Raphitomidae.

Description
The length of the shell attains 36.2 mm, its diameter 12.8 mm.

Distribution
This marine species occurs off East Indonesia.

References

External links
 MNHN, Paris: holotype
 

baruna
Gastropods described in 1997